Elisabeth Moore won the singles tennis title of the 1901 U.S. Women's National Singles Championship by defeating reigning champion Myrtle McAteer 6–4, 3–6, 7–5, 2–6, 6–2 in the challenge round. The draw included four past or present champions. Moore had won the right to challenge McAteer by defeating Marion Jones 4–6, 1–6, 9–7, 9–7, 6–3 in the final of the All Comers' competition. The event was played on outdoor grass courts and held at the Philadelphia Cricket Club in Wissahickon Heights, Chestnut Hill, Philadelphia from June 25 through June 29, 1901.

Draw

Challenge round

All Comers' finals

References

1901
1901 in women's tennis
June 1901 sports events
1901 in American women's sports
Women's Singles
Women's sports in Pennsylvania
Chestnut Hill, Philadelphia
1901 in sports in Pennsylvania